This article lists the major power stations located in Jiangxi province.

Non-renewable

Coal-based

Nuclear

Renewable

Hydroelectric

conventional

Pumped-storage

References 

Power stations
Jiangxi